George Snyder may refer to:

 George Snyder (politician) (1929–2017), Maryland State Senate majority leader, 1971–1974
 George Snyder (baseball) (1848–1905), Major League Baseball pitcher
 George W. Snyder (1780–1841), 19th-century watchmaker and inventor